Hafted Maul is a 1995 album by Dead Voices on Air.

Track listing

Credits
Mark Spybey - performer, artwork, producer
Zev Asher - performer (track 5)
cEvin Key - performer (track 9)
Mark Pilon - artwork

References

1995 albums